Roberto Carlos Chacón Rodríguez (born 25 April 1999) is a Venezuelan footballer who plays as a right-back for Héroes de Falcón.

Career

Club career
Chacón spent all his youth years at Deportivo Táchira and made his professional debut on 20 July 2016, playing all 90 minutes against Atlético Venezuela in the Venezuelan Primera División.

In the summer 2017, he was loaned out to Trujillanos to get some experience, where he made a total of eight appearances. In the beginning of January 2018 it was confirmed, that 18-year old Chacón had joined Monagas on loan for the whole year with an option to buy 50% of his rights. He continued for Monagas in the 2019 season and made a total of 43 appearances in his two years at the club, before he left at the end of 2019.

On 9 January 2020 Colombian club Cúcuta Deportivo confirmed the signing of Chacón. However, only five days later, it was reported that the cooperation had been terminated by mutual consent. According to a journalist, the decision was made by Cucuta's president, who wasn't impressed by Chacón. He returned to Venezuela and joined Angostura FC.

On 23 March 2021, Chacón joined Ureña. In 2022, Chacón was playing for Yaracuyanos. In January 2023, he moved to Héroes de Falcón.

References

External links
 

Living people
1999 births
Association football defenders
Venezuelan footballers
Venezuelan expatriate footballers
Venezuela youth international footballers
Venezuelan Primera División players
Deportivo Táchira F.C. players
Trujillanos FC players
Monagas S.C. players
Cúcuta Deportivo footballers
Yaracuyanos FC players
Venezuelan expatriate sportspeople in Colombia
Expatriate footballers in Colombia
People from Táchira